Nothocestrum breviflorum, commonly known as smallflower aiea, is a species of tree in the nightshade family, Solanaceae, that is endemic to the island of Hawaii. These forests are dominated by ōhia lehua (Metrosideros polymorpha) and koa (Acacia koa) or lama (Diospyros sandwicensis), while plants associated with smallflower aiea include wiliwili (Erythrina sandwicensis) and uhiuhi (Caesalpinia kavaiensis). It is threatened by habitat loss. It is federally listed as an endangered species of the United States. There are fewer than 50 individuals remaining.

References

External links

Physaleae
Endemic flora of Hawaii
Biota of Hawaii (island)
Trees of Hawaii
Taxonomy articles created by Polbot